The Party of Unity and Social Liberalism (PULS) is a minor social-liberal party in Guinea. It was founded in May 2008 following the wave of popular protests which began in 2007. The leader of the party is Mr Alpha Mamadou Diallo.

The PULS advocates national unity, the establishment of the rule of law, continued dialogue between social groups, and the adoption of social liberalism as a model for development.
It is a member of the Africa Liberal Network.

References

External links
Official website

Political parties in Guinea
Liberal parties in Africa
Social liberal parties